Special Olympics Bangladesh is a national organization in Bangladesh that works with intellectually disabled individuals and help them through participation in sports.

History
Special Olympics Bangladesh was founded in 1994. It works with Special Olympics and has more than 66 thousand registered athletes. Shamim Matin Chowdhury is chairman of the board while Faruqul Islam is the national director. Grameenphone in partnership with Special Olympics launched a talent hunt for disabled athletes in 2008 in Bangladesh. In 2009, Special Olympics Bangladesh organized a two-day training program on field hockey for athletes and trainers.

Competition
The fifth national games of Bangladesh Special Olympics was held in 2010 in the Army Stadium, Dhaka.

In the 2015 Special Olympics the Bangladesh team won 18 gold medals. The team of Special Olympics Bangladesh won 22 gold medals in the 2019 special olympics. 139 athletes participated in the 2019 special olympics in Doha from Bangladesh.

References

Special Olympics
Sport in Bangladesh
Bangladesh at multi-sport events
Disability organisations based in Bangladesh
1994 establishments in Bangladesh
Sports organizations established in 1994
Parasports in Bangladesh
Parasports organizations
Sports governing bodies in Bangladesh